Gjermund is a given name. Notable people with the name include:

Gjermund Åsen (born 1991), Norwegian footballer
Gjermund Eggen (born 1941), Norwegian cross country skier
Gjermund Hagesæter (born 1960), Norwegian politician
Thor Gjermund Eriksen (born 1966), Norwegian journalist and editor